João Ferreira may refer to:

 Bigode (João Ferreira, 1922–2003), Brazilian footballer
 João Augusto Ferreira de Almeida (1873–1917), executed Portuguese soldier
 João Ferreira (politician) (born 1978), Portuguese politician
 João Ferreira (hurdler) (born 1986), Portuguese athlete
 João Ferreira (footballer) (born 2001), Portuguese footballer